Mustafa Abu Ali, (1940 in Maliha, Palestine – 30 July 2009 in Jerusalem) was a Palestinian filmmaker.

Abu Ali studied at the University of California-Berkeley in the 1960s before studying cinema in London, graduating in 1967. He is considered one of the founders of Palestinian cinema, and the Palestinian Cinema Association in Beirut in 1973, (re-established in Ramallah in 2004). Along with Sulafa Jadallah and Hani Jowharieh, he established the Palestine Film Unit (PFU)--which saw its primary task as "documenting the revolution and creating an archive of images of  historical documents". After the PLO's move to Lebanon after the events of Black September, the PFU was renamed the Palestine Cinema Institute and became one of the seven departments of the PLO's Unified Media. Abu Ali headed the department from 1973 to 1975.

Abu Ali wrote four screenplays and directed more than 30 films, for which he won more than 14 awards, the most recent from the 2003 Ismailia Film Festival.

Notable films
1968: No to a Peaceful Solution 
1971: With Soul, With Blood
1974: They Don't Exist

See also
Cinema of Palestine

References

External links
Emily Jacir: Palestinian Revolution Cinema Come to NYC, 16 February 2007, The Electronic Intifada
Mustafa Abu Ali at "Dreams of a Nation", Columbia University
Khaled Elayya:  A Brief History of Palestinian Cinema, This week in Palestine
Annemarie Jacir:  Coming Home: Palestinian Cinema,  27 February 2007, The Electronic Intifada
 They Do Not Exist (Laysa lahum wujud) (25:09) (1974)

Palestinian film directors
1940 births
2009 deaths
Palestinian expatriates in the United States
University of California, Berkeley alumni
Palestinian expatriates in the United Kingdom